The Bank of Searcy is a historic bank building at 301 North Spruce Street in downtown Searcy, Arkansas.  It is a two-story buff brick structure, whose main entrance is flanked by Doric columns supporting a segmented arch.  The building has other vernacular elements of the Classical Revival, including segmented-arch window bays on the facade facing Arch Avenue.  It was built in 1906, following a fire that destroyed many of the commercial buildings on the west side of the courthouse, which stands across North Spruce Street.

The building was listed on the National Register of Historic Places in 1991.

See also
National Register of Historic Places listings in White County, Arkansas

References

Bank buildings on the National Register of Historic Places in Arkansas
Commercial buildings completed in 1905
National Register of Historic Places in Searcy, Arkansas
1905 establishments in Arkansas
Neoclassical architecture in Arkansas